Marlon Tapales (born March 23, 1992) is a Filipino professional boxer who held the WBO bantamweight title from 2016 to 2017.

Professional career 
He has lost to future world titlist David Sánchez.

In 2016, Tapales won the World Boxing Organization bantamweight world title over Pungluang Sor Singyu.

Tapales vs. Iwasa 
On December, 2019, Tapales fought Ryosuke Iwasa for the vacant IBF super bantamweight title. Iwasa won via an eleventh round TKO.

Tapales vs. Teshigawara 
On 11 December 2021, Tapales fought Teshigawara, ranked #3 by the IBF at super bantamweight. Tapales managed to stop Teshigawara within two rounds.

Professional boxing record

Titles in boxing 
Major titles:
WBO bantamweight title (118 lbs)
Regional titles:
WBO Asia Pacific bantamweight title (118 lbs)
Philippines Games & Amusement Board (GAB) light flyweight title (108 lbs)

References

External links
 
 Marlon Tapales - Profile, News Archive & Current Rankings at Box.Live

1992 births
World Boxing Organization champions
Bantamweight boxers
Living people
Filipino male boxers